The Galena Creek Bridge is a twin-span concrete arch bridge in Washoe County, Nevada. The bridge carries Interstate 580 and U.S. Route 395 over the Galena Creek between Carson City and Reno. It was opened to traffic in late August 2012.

The bridge is reportedly the largest cathedral arch bridge in the world; that is a type of open-spandrel deck arch bridge where the arch supports the deck only at the center.

Construction was started in 2003 but was delayed by a number of safety concerns and other issues. In 2006, the original prime contractor found the planned construction method unsafe; the method was revised and a new contractor hired.  In 2010, several long superficial cracks were found. On July 28, 2012, the Nevada Department of Transportation held a community event for pedestrian, bicycle, and limited motor vehicle traffic to see the bridge prior to it opening for traffic; the bridge and freeway project opened in late August 2012.

See also
 List of bridges in the United States by height

References

External links

 General Technologies, Inc.: Galena Creek Concrete Arch Bridge

Bridges on the Interstate Highway System
Bridges of the United States Numbered Highway System
Bridges completed in 2012
Buildings and structures in Washoe County, Nevada
Concrete bridges in the United States
Cathedral arch bridges
Road bridges in Nevada
U.S. Route 395
Open-spandrel deck arch bridges in the United States